Pseudopharus domingona is a moth in the family Erebidae first described by Herbert Druce in 1916. It is found in Peru.

References

Phaegopterina
Arctiinae of South America
Moths described in 1906